Fred Kaihea (born 17 March 1999 in New Zealand) is a New Zealand-born Australian rugby union player who plays for the  in Super Rugby. His playing position is prop. He was named in the Brumbies squad for Round 6 of the 2021 Super Rugby AU season.

Reference list

External links
itsrugby.co.uk profile

Australian rugby union players
1999 births
Living people
Rugby union props
Rugby union players from Christchurch
Canberra Vikings players
ACT Brumbies players